Paul Arjan Singh is a tech entrepreneur from London who pioneered the use of Dashcam technology for commercial vehicles to improve road safety and efficiency.

Career
Singh began his technology business, Y3K, in 2000, to design and distribute CCTV security cameras for residential and commercial use. By 2006 as advances in technology made smaller recording devices possible, he started working on prototypes of a camera which could be attached to the windscreen of a vehicle to record video, GPS location, driving style information and collision incidents. This type of device then became widely known as a Dashcam.

His first commercial Dashcam, the SmartWitness SVC100 was launched in 2007. At the time it was the only Dashcam of its type and was followed by the SmartWitness KP1 in 2009, the first 3G connected video telematics camera. They have subsequently been officially recognised by the United States Patents and Trademarks Office. 

These new connected commercial dashcams were able to perform the dual function of providing video evidence as well as being an Event Data Recorder which was required by US Federal Law.  As a result, the KP1 was hugely successful and led to SmartWitness expanding into the US and creating an American HQ in Chicago.

In 2015, Keith Hellawell, the former Chief Constable of Cleveland and West Yorkshire was brought in as non-executive Chairman.

By 2017 SmartWitness had supplied over 250,000 connected camera devices to fleet customers in the commercial logistics sector in the US and UK.

Road safety campaigning 
Singh has been involved in many projects to improve road safety for commercial vehicles, private motorists, pedestrians and cyclists. 

In 2015 he developed new camera systems to reduce driver distraction and fatigue incidents after a survey he commissioned found that one in five motorists admitted using their mobiles at the wheel. He also pushed for the banning of the use of wearable technology while driving, in particular the Apple Watch, following research by the Transport Research Laboratory that showed they caused more driver distraction than mobile devices. 

In the same year Singh worked with Keith Hellawell to call for the cessation of British Summer Time after SmartWitness research into Department for Transport data showed that it could lead to a reduction in pedestrian road accidents especially for children.

In 2016 he called for compulsory video recording devices for autonomous vehicles in order to provide proof of fault in the event of an accident.

In 2018 Singh commissioned research into the serious issue of driver fatigue which showed one in six UK drivers admitted they had previously fallen asleep at the wheel and in the same year he highlighted the growing issue of road rage incidents involving cyclists and motorists following an incident caught on a SmartWitness camera in South London.

In 2021 he designed new equipment to improve lorry drivers' visibility of vulnerable road users which would be compliant with London Mayor Sadiq Khan's new Direct Vision Standard rules for HGVs.

References

Living people
Year of birth missing (living people)
Businesspeople in technology

Consumer electronics
Technology company founders
Road transport

Electronics manufacturing
Surveillance
Digital electronics
Optics